John Brough (born 31 March 1960) is a Scottish former professional footballer, who played for Heart of Midlothian and Partick Thistle in the Scottish Football League.

References

External links

1960 births
Living people
Scottish footballers
Heart of Midlothian F.C. players
Partick Thistle F.C. players
Dunbar United F.C. players
Scottish Football League players
Association football goalkeepers
Scotland under-21 international footballers
Footballers from Edinburgh